is a Taisen Puzzle-Dama video game based on the manga Tsuyoshi Shikkari Shinasai (Tsuyoshi, Hold Tight). It was developed and published by Konami, and was released exclusively in Japan in 1994, for the Super Famicom.

References

External links 
 Game review at stevethefish.net
 Tsuyoshi Shikkari Shinasai: Taisen Puzzle-dama at superfamicom.org
 ツヨシしっかりしなさい 対戦ぱずるだま / Tsuyoshi Shikkari Shinasai: Taisen Puzzle-dama at super-famicom.jp 
 

1994 video games
Falling block puzzle games
Konami games
Japan-exclusive video games
Super Nintendo Entertainment System games
Super Nintendo Entertainment System-only games
Video games based on anime and manga
Multiplayer and single-player video games
Video games developed in Japan